The 1994 Taça de Portugal Final was the final match of the 1993–94 Taça de Portugal, the 54th season of the Taça de Portugal, the premier Portuguese football cup competition organized by the Portuguese Football Federation (FPF). The final was played at the Estádio Nacional in Oeiras, and opposed two Primeira Liga sides Porto and Sporting CP. As the inaugural final match finished goalless, the final was replayed five days later at the same venue with the Dragões defeating the Leões 2–1 to claim their eighth Taça de Portugal.

In Portugal, the final was televised live on RTP. As a result of Porto winning the Taça de Portugal, the Dragões qualified for the 1994 Supertaça Cândido de Oliveira where they took on 1993–94 Primeira Divisão winners Benfica.

Match

Details

Replay

Details

References

1994
1993–94 in Portuguese football
FC Porto matches
Sporting CP matches